Dan Kirby (born April 14, 1958) is a Republican politician from Oklahoma and a former member of the Oklahoma House of Representatives. Kirby was first elected to his seat in 2008, replacing Republican Dennis Adkins, and was reelected four times.

In January 2017, two legislative assistants accused Kirby of sexual harassment; after a House panel recommended his expulsion from the Senate, Kirby resigned in March.

Electoral history
Kirby ran unopposed in the 2008, 2010, 2012, and 2014 elections. In 2016, he defeated Democrat Karen Gaddis, receiving 59.56% of the vote; after his resignation, Gaddis won a special election to replace him.

References

1958 births
Living people
21st-century American politicians
21st-century Native American politicians
Republican Party members of the Oklahoma House of Representatives
Muscogee (Creek) Nation state legislators in Oklahoma
Politicians from Tulsa, Oklahoma